The Pitts is an American sitcom that aired Sunday at 9:30 on Fox between March and April 2003. It is about a family and their bad luck. The show featured absurd, fantastical plots presented within the context of a seemingly normal family sitcom. It was cancelled after two months.

Cast
 Dylan Baker as Bob Pitt, the father of the family.
 Kellie Waymire as Liz Pitt, the mother of the family.
 Lizzy Caplan as Faith Pitt, the oldest child of Bob and Liz.
 David Henrie as Petey Pitt, the youngest child of Bob and Liz.

Episodes

Cancellation and failed revival
Fox ordered seven episodes of the series; the network canceled the show after only five episodes aired. The last two episodes that aired on Fox aired on the same night, the first airing at 7:30/6:30 CT and the second airing at its regular timeslot at 9:30/8:30 CT. The final two episodes of the series aired two years later in the U.K.

On October 10, 2007, Fox announced an animated version of the show was in development. Of the main cast, Lizzy Caplan and Dylan Baker signed on to reprise their roles. Kellie Waymire died in 2003 and Allison Janney had been cast in her role. The part of Petey was to be played by Andy Milonakis replacing David Henrie who was already starring in Disney Channel's ''Wizards of Waverly Place.

On July 24, 2008, it was announced that the animated series had been taken out of production after a pilot had failed to impress Fox executives.

References

External links
 

2000s American sitcoms
2003 American television series debuts
2003 American television series endings
English-language television shows
Fox Broadcasting Company original programming
Television series about dysfunctional families
Television shows set in the United States
Television series by 20th Century Fox Television